Queen's Diamond Jubilee Medal may refer to:

 Queen Victoria Diamond Jubilee Medal (1897)
 Queen Elizabeth II Diamond Jubilee Medal (2012)